Blue Zone (known as Blue Zone UK in the United States due to a naming dispute there) were a 1980s British band. The group consisted of Lisa Stansfield (lead vocals), Ian Devaney (trombone, keyboards, guitar, backing vocals) and Andy Morris (trumpet, flugelhorn, electronic keyboards, backing vocals).

History
After the singles "On Fire", "Thinking About His Baby" (released in 1987), "Jackie" and album Big Thing (released in 1988), the trio and label Arista decided to focus on Stansfield's solo career. Morris would co-write and co-produce the first three Stansfield albums before departing the trio. Devaney and Stansfield would eventually marry and now own a music publishing business while they also continue to write and record together.

Discography

Studio albums

Singles

References

English pop music groups
British soul musical groups
British musical trios
Musical groups from Greater Manchester
Arista Records artists